Urnyak (Ürnäk) is a rural locality (a village) in Abishevsky Selsoviet, Khaybullinsky District, Bashkortostan, Russia. The population was 149 as of 2010. There are 3 streets.

Geography 
Urnyak is located 53 km west of Akyar (the district's administrative centre) by road. Chukari-Ivanovka is the nearest rural locality.

References 

Rural localities in Khaybullinsky District